Horsfieldia superba is a species of plant in the family Myristicaceae. It is a tree found in Sumatra, Peninsular Malaysia, and Singapore, and is threatened by habitat loss. It is used in traditional herbal medicine and contains an alkaloid called horsfiline, which has analgesic effects, as well as several other compounds including 5-MeO-DMT and 6-methoxy-2-methyl-1,2,3,4-tetrahydro-β-carboline.

References

superba
Trees of Malaya
Flora of Peninsular Malaysia
Flora of Singapore
Trees of Sumatra
Near threatened flora of Asia
Taxonomy articles created by Polbot